Francis Joseph "Frank" Masley (June 30, 1960 – September 10, 2016) was an American luger. He competed in the 1980, 1984, and 1988 Winter Olympics. He was the first Olympic flag-bearer in USA Luge history in the 1984 Olympic opening ceremonies.

Born in Wilmington, Delaware, Masley attended Christiana High School and later earned a degree in mechanical engineering from Drexel University.

He died of melanoma on September 10, 2016, aged 56, at home in Wilmington, Delaware.

Business career 
Frank founded Masley Enterprises INC in the basement of his own home in July 2000.

Company Awards 

 Small Business Administration Delaware Small Business 2010 Person of the Year 
 White House and the Small Business Administration Champion for Change award in 2014
 Delaware State Chamber of Commerce 2016 Gilman award

Athletic career 
Frank Masley started his Luge career in the 1970s. During his career, he would compete in 3 winter Olympics, and collect 10 US titles in both singles and double luge events. Frank was the 1980, 1983, and 1984 doubles luge champion with his sliding partner, Raymond Bateman. He was the first Olympic flag-bearer in USA Luge history in the opening ceremonies of the 1984 Winter Olympic games.

Frank Masley was an incredible competitor and teammate. His contributions and athleticism would make him the first inductee to the Luge Hall of Fame.

Awards Named After 
Two Awards were created in memory of Frank.

Frank Masley Champion Award from the Small Business Administration 

 2017 Winner: Bob O’Brien, SCORE. Wilmington 
 2018 Winner: Michelle Morin, Delaware Office of Supplier Diversity, Dover
 2019 Winner: Michael Bowman, Delaware Small Business Development Center  Newark

USA Luge Frank Masley Trophy

References

External links
 

1960 births
2016 deaths
American male lugers
Lugers at the 1980 Winter Olympics
Lugers at the 1984 Winter Olympics
Lugers at the 1988 Winter Olympics
Olympic lugers of the United States
Deaths from cancer in Delaware
Sportspeople from Wilmington, Delaware
Drexel University alumni
Deaths from melanoma